Sigdel is a Hindu surname found in Nepal. Sigdel surname falls under Aatreya Clan(Sanskrit: गोत्र) like other surnames such as Poudel and Godar Thapa. People with this surname are living in different belts of Nepal such as Tanahun, Jhapa, Biratnagar, Makwanpur and Kavre.

Notable people with surname Sigdel include:
 Aaryan Sigdel, Nepalese actor
 Priya Sigdel, Nepalese beauty pageant titleholder

References

See also
List of most common surnames in Asia

Surnames of Nepalese origin
Khas surnames